Barugo (IPA: [bɐˈɾugo]), officially the Municipality of Barugo, is a 4th class municipality in the province of Leyte, Philippines. According to the 2020 census, it has a population of 34,497 people.

Residents of the town of Barugo are traditionally referred to as Barugonon but often incorrectly referred to as Barugueños.

History

Early during the Spanish rule, the area was given the status of a pueblo (town) when it was established as an "encomienda." An encomienda was a land estate awarded to deserving Spaniards for services rendered to the Spanish Crown. The grantee of an encomienda, known as encomiendero, was given the right to rule the encomienda in accordance with the Spanish laws and to extract tributes from the natives, part of which went to the Spanish Crown.

Miguel Lopez de Legaspi, the first governor of Las Islas Filipinas, started the practice of designating large landed estates as encomiendas. Only ten months after Cebu and Manila became encomiendas, Barugo was also designated as one on November 3, 1571. Rodrigo de Vargas was the first encomiendero for Barugo.

The education of the natives in Leyte started with the arrival of the Jesuits on July 16, 1595. The mission schools in the beginning concentrated on the basics of Christianity. Barugo initially was only a "visita" of Carigara, meaning that it was under the administrative and spiritual supervision of the curate of Carigara, and was under the care of Fr. Mateo Sanchez, who eventually became its first parish priest after Barugo was declared as an independent parish. It was Fr. Sanchez who established the first church in Barugo.

The Jesuits stayed in Leyte from 1595 to 1767. During that time they expanded their influence starting from Carigara and Barugo, in the hinterlands of Ogmuc (Ormoc), Dulac (Dulag), Palo, Alangalang, Malibago (?) and the entire island of Cibabaw (Samar). When Charles III of Spain ordered the expulsion of the Jesuits from all Spanish dominions in 1767, the Jesuit mission on Leyte was handed over to the Augustinians. And later in 1843, the same missions were taken over by the Franciscan Friars. Fray Timoteo Calderon was the first Franciscan curate assigned to Barugo. At that time in 1843, Barugo already had 1,744 taxpayers and 8,381 residents. The towns of Alangalang, Jaro, Babatngon, Malibago (?) and San Miguel were once only "visitas" of Barugo.

In Barugo there is a legend which was being taught to elementary pupils during the 1950s and 1960s regarding how the town got its name. The legend goes like this: "Once upon a time there was a man named Cassadok. One day while he was resting by the river bank under the shade of a giant tree, a Spaniard came along and asked him the name of the place. Cassadok did not understand Spanish and thinking the Spaniard was asking the name of the big shady tree, answered "Balugo." From that time on, the place came to be known as "Balugo." When the Americans came, they changed the letter "L" to "R" and thus to this day the town is called Barugo." This story has no basis in fact and is simply a legend. For the early Spanish historians and chroniclers have always referred to the town by the name it carries today, Barugo.

Today Barugo nestles along the coast of Carigara Bay. But the original settlement of Barugo was way upstream by the banks of the Himanglos River, which during the time of the conquistadores was called Barugo River.

It is highly probable that the first Barugo settlement was in the place which is now known as Nasunogan, meaning a place burned down. This assumption is born by the fact that the old Spanish road leading to the towns of Tunga and Jaro starts at this place and the ruins of an old Spanish stone church is found there. This assumption is also corroborated, firstly, by the writings of Fr. Chirino wherein he described their travels by foot to Barugo and of a settlement by "la orilla," meaning by the bank of a river and by the mouth of the river. Secondly, the story of Fr. Mateo Sanchez, regarding their attempt to reach a seriously sick man, tells of their travel from the town of Barugo by "a small boat in which we sailed to seek our sick man, who was living in horon, far from the town and near the coast."

From Nasunogan, after the old settlement was burned, the people moved to another place which is now called Binongto-an, meaning a place abandoned as a town, now a sitio of Barangay Pikas. The settlers did not stay there long and moved eventually to the present site of the town. This conclusion stems from the fact that lasting structures can be found in Binongto-an.

(Excerpts from the research Barugo - Its Fabled History, conducted by a prominent Barugon-on, then Joel Villasin Aruta; excerpts edited and embellished by JC Himanglos.)

Geography

Barangays
Barugo is politically subdivided into 37 barangays.

Climate

Demographics

Economy 

Barugo remains an agricultural town producing rice, corn and copra. Residents of a few coastal barangays are engaged in small-scale fishing and aquaculture. Its cottage industries are the manufacture of tuba (coconut palm wine) and roscas (sweet pastries made of flour, sugar, eggs and shortening). Not unlike the rest of the country, its economy is partly driven by dollar remittances from overseas workers.

Government

Elected officials
These are the elected officials of the Municipality of Barugo as a result of the 2019 elections:
Mayor: Balais, Dr. Aron C.
Vice Mayor: Tiu, Josephine C.
Members of the Sangguniang Bayan:
Dehayco, Don
Avestruz, Wayne
Calzita, Ed
Astorga, Nikkos
Balais, Clinio
Cañezal, Jeffrey
Cabanacan, Jesse
Adrales, Domingo

References
 COMELEC Official 2013 Election Results. Date Accessed: 6 May 2014, 5:39 PM.

External links

Official Website of the Municipality of Barugo
 [ Philippine Standard Geographic Code]
Philippine Census Information
Local Governance Performance Management System

Municipalities of Leyte (province)